Thunder Bay is a bay in the U.S. state of Michigan on Lake Huron.

The entire bay lies within Alpena County, with Alpena Township in the north and Sanborn Township in the south.

Several islands in the bay are protected as part of the Michigan Islands National Wildlife Refuge. Thunder Bay Island lies just east of North Point outside the bay. The wildlife in the Bay's waters are protected as part of the Thunder Bay National Marine Sanctuary.

The name is the English translation of the French Anse du Tonnerre, which appears as early as the map of Franquelin in 1688. It was probably derived from the Native American name, as they believed that the Bay was peculiarly subject to thunder storms.

There are a substantial number of shipwrecks in and around Thunder Bay.  Diving is an important activity.

References

Bodies of water of Alpena County, Michigan
Bays of Michigan
Bays of Lake Huron